Erland Pison (born 4 October 1974) was a Belgian politician. After completing his lawstudies at the Katholieke Universiteit Leuven, he moved in 1999 to Brussels to start his legal career in public law. From 2004 till 2009 he was elected for the Brussels Parliament. From 2006 till 2009 he was also elected municipal councillor of Koekelberg. In 2010 he left politics and the bar of Brussels to study international relations.

References

1974 births
Living people
Vlaams Belang politicians
Members of the Parliament of the Brussels-Capital Region
People from Schoten
21st-century Belgian politicians